G5, G.V, G.5 or G-5 may refer to:

Businesses and companies
 G5 Entertainment, a video game developer and publisher; see list of PlayStation minis
 G5, IATA code for China Express Airlines

Electronics and software
 Canon PowerShot G5, a digital camera
 Dell G5 Series, a series of gaming laptops
 G5 bipin, a lamp standard
 LG G5, a smartphone developed by LG Electronics
 Logitech G5, a gaming mouse with variable weight and sensitivity settings
 Motorola G5 project, the failed Motorola PowerPC project to succeed its own PPC 74x
 PowerPC G5, the PowerPC 970 microprocessor from IBM
 iMac G5, an all-in-one desktop computer by Apple
 Power Mac G5, Apple's marketing name for models of the Power Macintosh which contain the IBM PowerPC 970 CPU

Groups and organizations
 G5, former name for G6 (EU), a group of the largest West European countries
 G5 (universities), a grouping of five public research universities in England
 G5 Sahel, an alliance of five countries in West Africa
 Group of Five, five nations which have joined together for an active role in the rapidly evolving international order
 Group of Five conferences, college football conferences in the United States

Military
 G-5-class motor torpedo boat, a World War II Soviet torpedo boat
 G5 carbine, a Georgian assault rifle
 G5 howitzer, a South African howitzer
 G.V (pronounced "G5"), a German designation for several World War I heavy bombers:
 AEG G.V, a biplane bomber aircraft of World War I, a further refinement of the AEG G.IV
 Gotha G.V, a heavy bomber used by the Luftstreitkräfte (Imperial German Air Service) during World War I

Science 
 G5 star, a subclass of G-class stars
 Group 5 element, part of the periodic table of elements
 Haplogroup G2c (Y-DNA), a human Y chromosome haplogroup, formerly known as haplogroup G5 (Y-DNA)

Transportation

Aircraft
 Fiat G.5, an Italian aerobatic tourer
 Gribovsky G-5, a Russian sport aircraft
 Gulfstream V, an American business jet

Automobiles
 BYD G5, a Chinese compact sedan
 Enranger G5, a Chinese compact crossover
 Gonow Aoosed GX5, a Chinese mid-size SUV previously known as G5
 Moskvitch G5, a Soviet Formula One car
 Pontiac G5, an American compact sedan/coupe
 Riich G5, a Chinese mid-size sedan

Engines
 Mazda G5, a Mazda G engine

Motorcycles
 Yamaha Libero G5, a Japanese-Indian motorcycle

Rail
 G5, station number for Gaiemmae Station, of the Tokyo Metro Ginza Line
 LNER Class G5, the post-1923 designation for NER Class O steam locomotives
 PRR G5, a 4-6-0 steam locomotive built for the Pennsylvania Railroad
 Prussian G 5.1, Prussian G 5.4, and Prussian G 5.5 a series of 2-6-0 steam locomotives built for the Prussian state railroads

Roads and routes
 G5 Beijing–Kunming Expressway

Other uses
 G5 paper, a Swedish paper format additional to SIS 014711

See also
 5G (disambiguation)
 Go Gawa poetry club, an artistic group from early 19th century Japan and leading patron of surimono woodblock prints
 GV (disambiguation)